Tajikistan participated at the 2006 Asian Games held in Doha from December 1 to December 15, 2006. Tajikistan ranked 24th with 2 gold medals in this edition of the Asiad.

Medalists

References

Nations at the 2006 Asian Games
2006
Asian Games